Saboot (English: Proof) is an Indian crime series based on the howdunit format with Anita Kanwar, returning from a six-year hiatus, playing the lead role of CBI officer and Chief of Homicide, Inspector KC. Though it was inspired by many crime series, the "howdunit" format and KC's "dishevelled appearance and clumsiness" was based on Columbo.

The series was written by Mitali Bhattacharya and directed by Ravi Ojha. It was produced by Cinevistaas and telecast on Star Plus during 1998–99. It was later telecast on Doordarshan as Inspector KC.

Cast
 Anita Kanwar as Inspector KC

References

Indian crime television series
StarPlus original programming
1998 Indian television series debuts
1999 Indian television series endings